Only One Flo (Part 1) is the third studio album by American rapper Flo Rida, which was released on November 30, 2010, through Atlantic Records, and his own label Poe Boy Entertainment. The album was preceded by the singles "Club Can't Handle Me", and "Turn Around (5, 4, 3, 2, 1)" which were released in June and November 2010, respectively. 

The album received mixed reviews from critics, and peaked at number 107 on the Billboard 200, selling 11,000 copies in its first week in the US. It is currently his least successful release. It is also considerably short for a studio album, with 8 tracks which total up to less than 30 minutes. A follow-up project titled Only One Rida (Part 2) was set to be released in 2011, but was renamed Wild Ones.

Background 
"Only One Flo" is the first part of what was originally a two-in-one album, but the next album, Only One Rida (Part 2), was renamed Wild Ones. This album is Flo Rida's first one to be released without the Parental Advisory sticker. The album features guest appearances from Git Fresh, Akon, Laza Morgan, Kevin Rudolf, Ludacris, Gucci Mane, and was originally supposed to also feature guest appearances from Lil Wayne, and Jay Rock. Producers having collaborated with Flo Rida on the album include Axwell, DJ Frank E, Dada Life, Infinity, Antario "tario" Holmes, Dr. Luke, Max Martin, Benny Blanco, Boi-1da, Ester Dean, Los da Mystro, David Guetta, Frédéric Riesterer, Knobody, Slade, Wayne-O, Mike Caren, and David Siegel.

Singles 
A promo single, titled "Zoosk Girl", which features T-Pain, was released on the Internet; though the song is not featured on the album, the single does have its own music video. On June 28, 2010, Flo Rida released the song "Club Can't Handle Me" featuring David Guetta, which was stated to be the official first single for the album. The song was also featured in the Step Up 3D soundtrack. On November 2, 2010, "Come with Me" was released as the first promo single for the album, along with "Puzzle", produced by, and featuring Electrixx, which isn't featured on the album. On November 16, 2010, "Turn Around (5, 4, 3, 2, 1)" was released as the second official promo single for the album via the iTunes Store. It debuted on the Australian Singles Chart at number thirty-four on November 29, 2010. After the release of the album in the UK, "Who Dat Girl" featured Akon started to receive a strong number of downloads, thus causing it to debut at number 39 in US and 64 in UK. "Why You Up In Here" was released as the fourth single, and third promo single, on May 11, 2011. The song features Ludacris, Gucci Mane, and Git Fresh.

Reception

Commercial performance 
The album debuted at number 107 on the Billboard 200, with first-week sales of 11,000 copies. The album also charted at number eighty-two in Australia. As of March 25, 2012 the album has sold 61,500 copies in the United States.

Critical reception 

Upon its release, Only One Flo (Part 1) received generally mixed reviews from music critics. At Metacritic, which assigns a normalized rating out of 100 to reviews from mainstream critics, the album received an average score of 55, based on six reviews, which indicates "mixed or average reviews".

David Jeffries of Allmusic gave the album three-and-a-half stars out of five, praising the Nightclub nature of the songs. He particularly complimented the production of "Who Dat Girl" and thought sampling of George Kranz and Yello on "Turn Around (5, 4, 3, 2, 1)". Entertainment Weekly Mikael Wood gave the album a "C" rating, disappointed that the quality of the songs didn't go beyond that of "Club Can't Handle Me". He also felt that the appearance of guests Ludacris and Gucci Mane on "Why You Up in Here" outshone that of Flo Rida.

Track listing

Personnel 

 Flo Rida – composer, executive producer, vocals
 Aaron Bay-Schuck – A&R, director
 Akon – vocals
 John Armstrong – engineer
 Axwell – composer, engineer, producer, various
 Erica Bellarosa – legal counsel
 Nick Bilardello – art direction, design
 Benny Blanco – composer, producer, programming, various
 Boris Blank – composer
 Boi-1da – composer, producer
 Candice Boyd – vocals
 Julian Bunetta – composer
 Christine Calip – legal counsel
 Nick Carcaterra – publicity
 Mike Caren – A&R, composer, director, executive producer, vocal producer
 Rufus Lee Copper – composer
 Olle Corneer – composer
 Katari T. Cox – composer
 Brian "Busy" Dackowski – marketing
 Dada Life – producer
 Ester Dean – composer
 Anne Decelemente – A&R, administration
  Aubry "Big Juice" Delaine – engineer
 Megan Dennis – production coordination
 Dr. Luke – composer, producer, programming, various
 Stefan Engblom – composer
 Scott Felcher – legal counsel
 Jerome Foster – composer
 Sandrine Fouilhoux – stylist
 Frank E. – producer
 Justin Franks – composer
 Evan Freifeld – legal counsel
 Yafeu Fula – composer
 Chris Gehringer – mastering
 Sydne George – composer
 Şerban Ghenea – mixing
 Rob Gold – art manager
 Tatiana Gottwald – assistant
 Gucci Mane – composer
 David Guetta – composer, producer
 John Hanes – engineer
 Dionnee Harper – direction, marketing
 Sam Holland – engineer
 Antario Dion Holmes – composer, keyboards, producer
 Infinity – producer
 Joanne "Joey" Joseph – A&R, coordination
 Jacob Kasher – composer

 Claude Kelly – composer, background vocals
 Carmen Key – composer
 Knobody – producer
 George Kranz – composer
 Philip Lawrence – composer
 Jordan Lewis – composer
 Kasia Levingston – composer
 Los da Mystro – composer, producer
 Ludacris – composer
 Erik Madrid – assistant, engineer
 Fabian Marasciullo – mixing
 Manny Marroquin – mixing
 Bruno Mars – composer
 John Maultsby – composer
 Catharine McNelly – publicity
 Dieter Meier – composer
 J. P. "The Specialist" Negrete – A&R, coordination, engineer, vocal producer
 Chris "Tek" O'Ryan – engineer
 Joseph Paquette – composer
 Christian Plata – assistant
 Priscilla Polete – composer, vocals
 Elvin "Big Chuck" Prince – executive producer
 Eric "E Class" Prince – executive producer
 Lee "Freezy" Prince – executive producer, management
 Irene Richter – production coordination
 Fred Riesterer – composer, producer
 Tim Roberts – assistant engineer
 Kevin Rudolf – composer
 Tony Scales – composer
 Alex Schwartz – A&R, coordination
 Theo Sedlmayr – legal counsel
 Tupac Shakur – composer
 Pamela Simon – packaging manager
 Marcus Slade – composer, producer
 Jordan Suecof – composer
 Wayne Thomas – composer
 Giorgio Tuinfort – composer, programming
 Is Vantage – engineer
 Bruce Washington – composer
 Wayne-O – producer
 Tyler "T-Minus" Williams – composer
 Zach Wolfe – photography
 Guy Wood – stylist
 Tyrone Wrice – composer
 Emily Wright – engineer
 Xplicit – composer

Charts

References 

2010 albums
Albums produced by DJ Frank E
Albums produced by Benny Blanco
Albums produced by Boi-1da
Albums produced by Dr. Luke
Albums produced by David Guetta
Atlantic Records albums
Flo Rida albums